Kakkad may refer to:

 Kakkad, Malappuram, a town in Kerala, India, part of Tiruraangadi municipality
 Kakkad, Kannur, a town in Kerala, India
 Kakkad in the Ernakulam district, Kerala, near Thiruvankulam
 Kakkad, Mukkam in Kozhikode district of Kerala, India, part of Karassery panchayath